The Campeonato Brasileiro Série B 2006, namely the second division of the Brazilian League, was contested by 20 teams. The tournament started in April 2006 and ended on November 25 of 2006. The 20 teams played home and away matches against each other and, by the end of the year, the four best-ranked were promoted to the first division and the four worst-ranked were relegated to the third division.

Final standings

2006 in Brazilian football leagues
Campeonato Brasileiro Série B seasons